Prees railway station serves the village of Prees in Shropshire, England, although the station is a mile to the west of the village and in the parish of Wem Rural. It was opened by the Crewe and Shrewsbury Railway in 1858.

The station has two platforms and trains only stop here upon request.  It is managed by Transport for Wales

Facilities
It is unstaffed and has no ticketing provision - tickets must be bought on the train or prior to travel.  The old buildings that once stood here have been demolished (as has the signal box following resignalling work in 2013) and only standard waiting shelters are now provided.  Train running information is offered via CIS displays, timetable posters and customer help points on each side (there is also a payphone on platform 2).  Step-free access is available to both platforms via ramps and the road crossing at the north end.

Services

Monday to Saturdays there is generally a two-hourly service from here southbound to Shrewsbury and northbound to Crewe.  These are mostly local trains stopping at all stations en route, but two on weekdays continue to  via the Heart of Wales Line and some early morning and late evening trains are through trains to either Manchester Piccadilly or Cardiff Central. Six southbound and four northbound trains call on Sundays.

References

Further reading

External links 

Railway stations in Shropshire
DfT Category F2 stations
Former London and North Western Railway stations
Railway stations in Great Britain opened in 1858
Railway stations served by Transport for Wales Rail
Railway request stops in Great Britain
1858 establishments in England